Bardstown Junction is an unincorporated community in Bullitt County, Kentucky, in the United States.

History
Bardstown Junction was built up at the junction of two railroads. A post office was established at Bardstown Junction in 1866, and remained in operation until it was discontinued in 1957.

References

Unincorporated communities in Bullitt County, Kentucky
Unincorporated communities in Kentucky